Ertaç Özbir (born 25 October 1989) is a Turkish professional footballer who plays as a goalkeeper for Adana Demirspor.

Club career
Özbir began his amateur footballing career as a youth player with Sincan Belediyespor. After four years with the club, he was transferred to Etimesgut Şekerspor. Özbir made his professional debut against Tokatspor on 14 February 2010. He totaled 13 appearances in the TFF Second League during the 2009–10 season. Kasımpaşa transferred him before the start of the 2010–11 season, making his Süper Lig against Antalyaspor on 3 October 2010. On 28 August 2019, Özbir signed a two-year contract with Gençlerbirliği. On 4 October 2020, Özbir returned to Yeni Malatyaspor, signing a two-year contract.

International career
Özbir was called up to the Turkey national under-21 football team for the first time in September 2010.

References

External links

1989 births
Living people
People from Seyhan
Turkish footballers
Turanspor footballers
Kasımpaşa S.K. footballers
Süper Lig players
Association football goalkeepers
Yeni Malatyaspor footballers